Interstate 3 may refer to either any of four unconnected Interstate Highways in the United States:

 Interstate 3, a proposed route in Georgia and Tennessee, with a possible route through South Carolina and North Carolina
 Interstate A-3 in Alaska
 Interstate H-3 in Hawaii
 Interstate PRI-3 in Puerto Rico

3